Glen Raven, Inc. is a fabric manufacturing and marketing company.  The company is headquartered in Glen Raven, North Carolina and headed by Leib Oehmig, who took over after  Allen Erwin Gant, Jr., the grandson of John Quintin Gant and founder of the industry advocacy group National Council of Textile Organizations, retired.  Glen Raven has operations in the United States, France, and China.

History

John Quintin Gant entered the dry goods retail business in Company Shops, NC (Burlington) in 1872 and opened the John Q. Gant & Co. Gant sold his interest in the company in 1880 and then partnered with Berry Davidson to build the Altamahaw Cotton Mills in Alamance County, NC. The company was founded as John Q. Gant Manufacturing Co. in 1900 by John Quintin Gant (1847–1930), and by 1902, the company’s name was changed to Glen Raven Cotton Mills.

The company began manufacturing cotton duck awning fabrics in 1908 and developing pantyhose in 1953.  Panti-Tights and Panti-Legs are introduced as the first commercial ladies pantyhose in 1959. In 1965, Glen Raven developed a seamless pantyhose that became popular due to the introduction of the miniskirt. Glen Raven exited the hosiery business in 1996. The company was also known for making duck cloth used in tents for World War I and making tent canvas, power bags, and parachute cloth for World War II.

Glen Raven claims to have woven the fabric used to make the first American flag that was planted on the moon at their weaving facility in Burnsville, NC. However, there is controversy and speculation whether the manufacturer of the fabric used in the American flag was made by Glen Raven or Burlington Industrial Fabrics. Glen Raven claims that they manufactured most of the nylon used in flags in the 1960s, while Burlington claims to have been the world’s largest textile company at the time. There is no clear documentation of where the flag was bought or who manufactured the fabric, and it still remains a mystery today.

The company introduced acrylic-based fiber in 1961 with Sunbrella, which has vastly superior durability to cotton. Today, Sunbrella fabrics are used in a variety of applications including outdoor furniture, indoor furniture, boat covers, convertible automobile tops, and awnings.  Glen Raven is best known for its Sunbrella line of performance fabrics.

In 1998 Glen Raven merged with Dickson SA of France, founded by David Dickson (1811–1869), a Scotsman and Officer of the Legion of Honour. The company started production in a new manufacturing facility in China on September 21, 2006.

In 2006, Sunbrella Awnings, Boat Tops, Canopies, and Umbrellas with Sun Protective Performance Fabrics UPF 50+ were awarded the "International Seal of Recommendation for UV Fabric/Umbrellas/Awnings" by The Skin Cancer Foundation, a worldwide organization dedicated to preventing skin cancer.

Glen Raven acquired the Astrup Company (founded in Cleveland, Ohio in 1876 by William J.O. Astrup) and John Boyle & Company (founded in Brooklyn, New York in 1860 by John Boyle) in 2007.  Strata Systems, Inc. was acquired as part of the purchase of John Boyle & Company, which itself, had previously acquired Strata Systems, Inc. The combined Astrup and John Boyle companies were renamed Tri Vantage in March 2008. Tri Vantage was rebranded as Trivantage in November 2012 with the tagline "Order. Done. Good Call."

In October 2017, Glen Raven acquired Sunbury Textile Mills, one of their strategic business partners for over twenty years. Sunbury became a wholly owned subsidiary of Glen Raven and operated as part of Glen Raven Custom Fabrics, LLC.

List of Subsidiaries

List of Brands

References

External links
 Glen Raven, Inc.
 Bloomberg Profile
 A list of all company branches from North Carolina State University
 Glen Raven Logistics
 Sunbrella
 Strata Systems, Inc.
 Trivantage

Manufacturing companies based in North Carolina
Companies established in 1880
Alamance County, North Carolina
1880 establishments in North Carolina